Pierre Bédier (born 30 September 1957 in Mont-de-Marsan, Landes) is a former member of the National Assembly of France. He represented the Yvelines department. Since 2014, he is President of the Departmental Council of Yvelines.

In 2009 Bedier was convicted of corruption.

References

1957 births
Living people
People from Mont-de-Marsan
Politicians from Nouvelle-Aquitaine
Rally for the Republic politicians
Union for a Popular Movement politicians
The Republicans (France) politicians
Deputies of the 10th National Assembly of the French Fifth Republic
Deputies of the 12th National Assembly of the French Fifth Republic
Deputies of the 13th National Assembly of the French Fifth Republic
Sciences Po alumni
French politicians convicted of corruption